Curvature refers to mathematical concepts in different areas of geometry.

Curvature may also refer to:

Curvature LLC, a network hardware company
Human vertebral column, curvature of the spine
Curvatures of the stomach, curvatures of the stomach
Figure of the Earth, curvature of the Earth
Degree of curvature, degree of curvature used in civil engineering
Curvature (film)